The Studebaker Light Six was a car built by the Studebaker Corporation of South Bend, Indiana from 1918 to 1927. It shared its wheelbase and standard equipment items with the Studebaker Light Four and was upgraded to the Studebaker Dictator in 1928.

Light Six

The Light Six originally came out in 1918.

Studebaker Standard Six
In August, 1924, the car was renamed the Studebaker Standard Six.

While in production, the Light Six / Standard Six represented Studebaker's least expensive model with a six cylinder engine, listing a retail price of USD$1,045 ($ in today's dollars). The car was available in a full array of body styles throughout its production.

Model EM (Light Six)
Engine Cylinders: L-head 6-cyl.
Displacement: 207.1 cu in.
Horsepower: 40 hp @ 2,000 rpm
•	Bore & Stroke: 3.125 x 4.5 in.
•	C. R.:  4.38:1
•	Carburetor: Stromberg 1V One-barrel
•	Wheelbase: 112 in. Wood Wheeels.
•	Tire: 4 x 31 in.
•	Transmission: Selective sliding 3-speed floor gearshift manual.

Studebaker Standard Six Dictator
In 1927, the car was renamed the Studebaker Standard Six Dictator in preparation for the 1928 model year when the car would be henceforth known as the Studebaker Dictator.

Standard Six Coach specifications (1926 data)
Color - Belgian blue with black upper structure
Seating Capacity – Five
Wheelbase - 
Wheels - Wood
Tires - 31” x 5.25” balloon
Service Brakes - contracting on rear
Emergency Brakes - contracting on drum at rear of transmission
Engine  - Six-cylinder, vertical, cast in block, 3-3/8 x 4-1/2 inches; head removable; valves in side; H.P. 27.3 N.A.C.C.
Lubrication - Force-feed
Crankshaft - Four bearing
Radiator – Tubular
Cooling – Water Pump
Ignition – Storage Battery
Starting System – Two Unit
Voltage – Six to eight
Wiring System – Single
Gasoline System – Vacuum
Clutch – Dry plate, single disc
Transmission – Selective sliding
Gear Changes – 3 forward, 1 reverse
Drive – Spiral bevel
Rear Springs – Semi-elliptic
Rear Axle – Semi-floating
Steering Gear – Worm-and-wheel

Standard equipment
The new car price included the following items:
tools
jack
speedometer
ammeter
electric horn
thief-proof lock
automatic windshield cleaner
demountable rims
stop light
spare tire carrier
rear-view mirror
sun visor
cowl ventilator
headlight dimmer
clock
dome light

Optional equipment
The following equipment on new cars was available at extra charge:
Hydraulic four-wheel brakes with disc wheels

Source:

References

 

Light Six